Faltalini is a tribe of leafhoppers in the subfamily Deltocephalinae. Faltalini is distributed from the southwestern United States south to Argentina and Chile. It contains 11 genera and over 25 species.

Genera 
There are currently 11 described genera in Faltalini:

References 

Deltocephalinae
Cicadellidae